The 1982 2. divisjon was a Norwegian second-tier football league season.

The league was contested by 24 teams, divided into two groups; A and B. Both groups consisted of 12 teams. The winners of group A and B were promoted to the 1983 1. divisjon. The second placed teams in group A and B met the 10th best finisher in 1. divisjon in a qualification round where the winner was promoted to 1. divisjon. The bottom three teams in both groups were relegated to the 3. divisjon.

Kongsvinger won group A with 32 points. Brann won group B with 32 points. Both teams promoted to the 1983 1. divisjon. The second-placed teams, Eik and Steinkjer met Fredrikstad in the promotion play-offs. Eik won the qualification round and won promotion.

Tables

Group A

Group B

Promotion play-offs

Results
Fredrikstad – Eik 2–3
Steinkjer – Fredrikstad 1–3
Eik – Steinkjer 2–1

Eik won the qualification round and won promotion to the 1. divisjon.

Play-off table

References

Norwegian First Division seasons
1982 in Norwegian football
Norway
Norway